Houston Lake is a city in Platte County, Missouri, and is part of the Kansas City metropolitan area within the United States. The population was 235 at the 2010 census.

Geography

Demographics

2010 census
As of the census of 2010, there were 235 people, 107 households, and 64 families living in the city. The racial makeup of the city was 94.0% White, 0.4% African American, 3.0% from other races, and 2.6% from two or more races. Hispanic or Latino of any race were 4.7% of the population.

There were 107 households, of which 22.4% had children under the age of 18 living with them, 43.0% were married couples living together, 13.1% had a female householder with no husband present, 3.7% had a male householder with no wife present, and 40.2% were non-families. 34.6% of all households were made up of individuals, and 11.2% had someone living alone who was 65 years of age or older. The average household size was 2.20 and the average family size was 2.77.

The median age in the city was 51.4 years. 16.2% of residents were under the age of 18; 6% were between the ages of 18 and 24; 21.8% were from 25 to 44; 42% were from 45 to 64; and 14% were 65 years of age or older. The gender makeup of the city was 46.4% male and 53.6% female.

2000 census
As of the census of 2000, there were 284 people, 119 households, and 69 families living in the city. The population density was 2,055.1 people per square mile (783.2/km2). There were 123 housing units at an average density of 890.1 per square mile (339.2/km2). The racial makeup of the city was 96.83% White, 0.70% African American, 0.35% Asian, and 2.11% from two or more races. Hispanic or Latino of any race were 3.52% of the population.

There were 119 households, out of which 27.7% had children under the age of 18 living with them, 44.5% were married couples living together, 11.8% had a female householder with no husband present, and 41.2% were non-families. 32.8% of all households were made up of individuals, and 8.4% had someone living alone who was 65 years of age or older. The average household size was 2.16 and the average family size was 2.69.

In the city the population was spread out, with 18.7% under the age of 18, 4.2% from 18 to 24, 28.9% from 25 to 44, 35.9% from 45 to 64, and 12.3% who were 65 years of age or older. The median age was 44 years. For every 100 females, there were 98.6 males. For every 100 females age 18 and over, there were 104.4 males.

The median income for a household in the city was $53,750, and the median income for a family was $61,875. Males had a median income of $48,750 versus $24,063 for females. The per capita income for the city was $24,471. About 1.5% of families and 4.0% of the population were below the poverty line, including 12.5% of those under the age of eighteen and none of those 65 or over.

References

Cities in Platte County, Missouri
Cities in Missouri